Osmar Bravo Amador (born 1 November 1984 in Nueva Guinea) is an amateur boxer from Nicaragua that qualified for the 2012 Olympics at light heavyweight (81 kg).

Osmar was a semi-finalist at light heavyweight at the 2012 American Boxing Olympic Qualification Tournament and this finish earned him his Olympic birth. Osmar became the first boxer to qualify for the Olympics from Nicaragua since Mario Romero at the 1992 Summer Olympics. At the 2012 Olympic Games, he beat Montenegrin boxer Bosko Draskovic, before losing to Ukrainian Oleksander Gvozdyk.

References

Living people
Light-heavyweight boxers
Boxers at the 2012 Summer Olympics
Olympic boxers of Nicaragua
Competitors at the 2014 Central American and Caribbean Games
Competitors at the 2018 Central American and Caribbean Games
Central American and Caribbean Games bronze medalists for Nicaragua
Nicaraguan male boxers
1984 births
Central American Games gold medalists for Nicaragua
Central American Games bronze medalists for Nicaragua
Central American Games medalists in boxing
Central American and Caribbean Games medalists in boxing